Wilhelm Jürgensen (1762 in Schleswick – 1842) was a Norwegian military officer. He had the rank of Captain from 1802, and the rank of Major from 1814. He commanded the Lærdalske lette infanterikompani from its establishment in 1802. He was decorated Knight of the Order of Dannebrog for his war merits.

References

1762 births
1842 deaths
German emigrants to Norway
Norwegian Army personnel
Norwegian military personnel of the Napoleonic Wars
Knights of the Order of the Dannebrog